The 1979 Australian Sports Sedan Championship was a CAMS sanctioned Australian motor racing title for drivers of Group B Sports Sedans. It was the fourth Australian Sports Sedan Championship.

The championship was won by Allan Grice driving a Chevrolet Corvair.

Calendar
The championship was contested over a nine round series.

Points system
Championship points were awarded on a 9–6–4–3–2–1 basis to the first six placegetters at each round. Only the best eight round results could be retained by each driver.

For rounds staged over two heats, points were allocated on a 20–16–13–11–10–9–8–7–6–5–4–3–2–1 basis to the first 14 finishers in each heat. These points were aggregated to determine the first six placegetters for the round. In the event of two or more drivers attaining the same total, the relevant round placing was awarded to the driver who place higher in the final heat.

Points table

Notes and references

External links
 Western Australian Motor Race Results 1979 
 autopics.com.au

National Sports Sedan Series
Sports Sedan Championship